The men's 1500 metres at the 2015 World Championships in Athletics was held at the Beijing National Stadium on 27, 28 and 30 August.

Summary
The process of running rounds in the 1500 tends to select strategic experts because nobody would want to run hard three times in four days as this schedule would require.  Since 2008 (excepting that bad race at the 2012 Olympics), the expert in this has been two-time defending champion Asbel Kiprop.  But in case anybody wanted to run fast, Kiprop also left a message at the fastest race of the year in Monaco, where he blew away many of the members of this field by almost 2 seconds in his near miss of the world record.  What makes Kiprop so dangerous is his ability to accelerate from the back of the field and in the final that is exactly where he went.  Was he hiding or just waiting to pounce?  With three other Kenyan teammates making it to the final, there was talk about a potential sweep.  Timothy Cheruiyot and Elijah Motonei Manangoi took the race through an honest first two laps in 1:58.62.  Only Aman Wote ran aggressively with them at the front, the other tacticians lining themselves up for the finish.  Matthew Centrowitz, Jr. was the first to move forward as they came through for the bell.  With 300 metres to go, Olympic champion Taoufik Makhloufi made his move, identical to the Olympics, Kiprop near the back of the pack beating only two Americans and boxed by Wote.  Over the next 100 metres, Makhloufi opened a lead chase by Abdalaati Iguider.  Kiprop slowed down to get out of the box, then ran around Wote out to lane 3.  The tall Kenyan was now clearly moving faster than the rest of the field he was passing on the outside.  As Kiprop swept past the field after the North African duo, only Silas Kiplagat came with him, these four breaking from the rest.  As Kiprop caught Iguider, he reacted and ran even with Kiprop up to Makhloufi.  With 50 metres to go, it was three abreast across the track with Kiplagat chasing Kiprop on the outside less than two metres back.  Kiprop broke past the two North Africans and ran on to victory, while Iguider edged ahead of a spent Makhloufi.  Out of nowhere (actually a distant fifth place) came sprinting Manangoi, faster than any of the leaders, drifting out to lane 3 for clear sailing.  Passing three people in the last 10 metres, Manangoi crossed the finish line just ahead of a desperately diving Iguider to take silver, Iguider doing a full face plant to the track across the finish line holding on to bronze.

Records
Prior to the competition, the records were as follows:

Qualification standards

Schedule

Results

Heats

Qualification: First 6 in each heat (Q) and the next 6 fastest (q) advanced to the semifinals.

Semifinals
Qualification: First 5 in each heat (Q) and the next 2 fastest (q) advanced to the final.

Final
The final was held on 30 August at 19:45.

References

1500
1500 metres at the World Athletics Championships